Palaina dimorpha is a species of minute land snail with an operculum, a terrestrial gastropod mollusk or micromollusks in the family Diplommatinidae. This species is endemic to Palau. It is distinguished from other similar species thanks to its bright coloration.

References

D
Endemic fauna of Palau
Molluscs of Oceania
Molluscs of the Pacific Ocean
Gastropods described in 1866
Taxonomy articles created by Polbot